Jelena Popović (born 4 September 1984) is a Serbian handballer who plays for the French club Nantes Handball and the Serbian national team.

Club career
Jelena played for the RK Medicinar Šabac, HC Naisa Niš, Kometal Gjorče Petrov Skopje, ŽRK Zaječar, ES Besançon and currently she is a member of the French team Nantes Handball.

National team
Popović represented Serbia and Montenegro at the 2005 Mediterranean Games and won a silver medal. She played for the Serbian national team at the 2012 European Handball Championship when the team finished 4th.

References

External links
 EHF Profile

Living people
1984 births
Serbs of Croatia
Sportspeople from Karlovac
Serbian female handball players
Expatriate handball players
Serbian expatriate sportspeople in North Macedonia
Serbian expatriate sportspeople in France
Mediterranean Games silver medalists for Serbia
Competitors at the 2005 Mediterranean Games
Mediterranean Games medalists in handball